The rings of Saturn are an extensive set of planetary rings in orbit about the planet Saturn.

Rings of Saturn may also refer to:

Literature
The Rings of Saturn, a 1995 novel by the German writer W. G. Sebald
Lucky Starr and the Rings of Saturn the final lucky Starr novel by Isaac Asimov.

Music 
Rings of Saturn (band), an American band
"Rings of Saturn", a song by Nick Cave and the Bad Seeds from Skeleton Tree 
Ring of Saturn (EP), an extended play by Goldie released in 1998
"The Rings of Saturn", a song by Emma-Jean Thackray released in 2022

Other uses 
 Rings of Saturn (video game), a 1981 video game for the Apple 48K
 Rings of Saturn, a professional wrestling hold also known as a double underhook crossface

See also
 Ring (disambiguation)
 Saturn (disambiguation)